John R. Jones (date of birth unknown) was a Welsh professional footballer who played as an inside forward. He made appearances in the English Football League for Wrexham and Crewe Alexandra.

References

Date of birth unknown
Date of death unknown
Welsh footballers
Association football forwards
English Football League players
Whitchurch F.C. players
Wrexham A.F.C. players
Crewe Alexandra F.C. players
Sandbach Ramblers F.C. players
People from Hawarden
Sportspeople from Flintshire